Egilsay is one of the Orkney Islands in Scotland, lying east of Rousay. The island is largely farmland and is known for its corncrakes and St Magnus Church, dedicated or re-dedicated to Saint Magnus, who was killed on the island in 1117 by an axe blow to the head. For hundreds of years the story of St. Magnus, part of the Orkneyinga saga, was considered just a legend until a skull with a large crack in it, such as it had been stricken by an axe, was found in the walls of St. Magnus Cathedral in Kirkwall.

Etymology 
Unusually for the Northern Isles, it has been suggested that Egilsay may have a partly Gaelic name. While at first sight, it appears to be Egil's island, "Egil" being a Norse personal name, the Gaelic eaglais (Celtic "eccles") meaning church, may be part of the root, as the island is dominated by a church of pre-Norse foundation. The island of Kili Holm just to the north, may represent cille, a monastic cell.

Present day 
The island's population was 26 as recorded by the 2011 census a drop of almost a third since 2001 when there were 37 usual residents. During the same period, Scottish island populations as a whole grew by 4% to 103,702.

Orkney Ferries sail from the island to Tingwall on the Orkney Mainland via Wyre and Rousay.

See also 
 Sir Alexander Douglas of Eagleshay

References

External links 

 Information on the island of Egilsay

Islands of the Orkney Islands